The fifteenth and final season of the American sketch comedy series Mad TV premiered in the United States on The CW on July 26, 2016, and ended on September 27, 2016.

Summary
Seven years after the show ended on FOX (and in celebration of the show's 20th anniversary), MADtv was briefly revived for eight episodes on The CW (with episodes rerunning on streaming service Hulu). Critics did not take kindly to the revival, feeling that the show's quality had dramatically fallen due to an inexperienced new cast, production values that were worse than what was shown during the show's last seasons on FOX, writers who were too restrained by the censorship rules of primetime American TV to be edgy and funny, and former cast members being brought back to help the cast.

On the casting front, Nicole Sullivan, Will Sasso, Ike Barinholtz, Bobby Lee, Debra Wilson, Aries Spears, Alex Borstein, Mo Collins, and Anjelah Johnson returned as guests. New cast members include Carlie Craig, Chelsea Davison, Jeremy D. Howard, Amir K (the show's first -- and only -- Middle Eastern cast member, as well as the second cast member after season one's Bryan Callen to be born outside of North America, and the only MADtv writer to be upgraded to cast member), Lyric Lewis, Piotr Michael, Michelle Ortiz, and Adam Ray.

Cast

Repertory cast members
 Carlie Craig (Ariana Grande, Megyn Kelly, Kristin Chenoweth, Britney Spears, Ann Coulter, additional characters)  (8/8 episodes) 
 Chelsea Davison (Adele, Lena Dunham, Melissa McCarthy, additional characters)  (8/8 episodes) 
 Jeremy D. Howard (Kanye West, Tracy Morgan, Sumbrella, additional characters)  (8/8 episodes) 
 Amir K. (Terrence Howard [as Lucious Lyon from Empire], Scott Baio, additional characters)  (8/8 episodes) 
 Lyric Lewis (Rihanna, Nicki Minaj, Taraji P. Henson [as Cookie Lyon from Empire], Viola Davis, Octavia Spencer, additional characters)  (8/8 episodes) 
 Piotr Michael (Donald Trump, Jeff Goldblum, Jimmy Fallon, Seth Rogen, Arnold Schwarzenegger, additional characters)  (8/8 episodes) 
 Michelle Ortiz (Melania Trump, Raven-Symone, Penélope Cruz, Idina Menzel, Dora the Explorer, additional characters)  (8/8 episodes) 
 Adam Ray (Pitbull (rapper), Alec Baldwin, Tony Danza, Wolf Blitzer, additional characters)  (8/8 episodes)

Original cast
 Nicole Sullivan (Hillary Clinton & Darlene McBride)
 Will Sasso (Bill Clinton, Kenny Rogers, & Michael Mcloud)
 Bobby Lee (Blind Kung Fu Master, Tank, & Kim Jong-un)
 Debra Wilson (Phylicia Rashad [as Clair Huxtable], Tova McQueen, & Oprah Winfrey)
 Ike Barinholtz (additional characters)
 Aries Spears (Bill Cosby [as Dr. Heathcliff Huxtable], Belma Buttons, Stedman)
 Mo Collins (Carol Fitty, Lorraine, additional characters)
 Anjelah Johnson (Bon Qui Qui)
 Alex Borstein (Ms. Swan & Jasmine Wayne-Wayne)  
 Stephnie Weir (Dot Goddard)

Episodes

Home Release
As of 2020, season 15 is not available on DVD, Blu-Ray, or on HBO Max (though episodes were temporarily streamed on Hulu).

References

External links

 Mad TV - Official Website
 
 Jump The Shark - Mad TV

15
2016 American television seasons